The 2020 Copa por México (officially Copa GNP por México for sponsorship reasons) was a  football preseason club tournament organized by the FMF prior to the 2020–21 Liga MX season that started on 23 July 2020.

The tournament was held in two stadiums in two cities; the Estadio Akron in Zapopan and the Estadio Olímpico Universitario inside Ciudad Universitaria in Mexico City. The tournament featured eight Mexican teams were divided into two groups of four teams.

The tournament started on 3 July 2020 and ended on 19 July 2020. Cruz Azul won the tournament defeating Guadalajara 2–1 in the final.

Venues

Teams
A total of 8 teams took part in the competition.
América
Atlas
Cruz Azul
Guadalajara
Mazatlán
Toluca
UANL
UNAM

Format 
The eight teams were divided into two groups of four teams, each team will play three matches at the group stages with the top two teams from each group progressing to the semi-finals, the winners of the semi-final matches then proceeds to the final.

Estadio Olímpico Universitario hosted all Group A, semi-finals and final matches. Estadio Akron hosted all Group B matches

Group stage
The top two teams from each group advance to the semi-finals.

All times are local, CST (UTC−5).

Group A
All matches were played at Estadio Olímpico Universitario, Mexico City.

Group B
All matches were played at Estadio Akron, Zapopan.

Knockout stage

Bracket

Semi-finals

Final

Final ranking
As per statistical convention in football, matches decided in extra time were counted as wins and losses, while matches decided by a penalty shoot-out were counted as draws.

Broadcasting rights

Television rights

Radio rights

References

External links
Official website of the Mexican Football Federation

Copa por México
Copa por México